Amos Amerson (born January 30, 1935) is an American military personnel, 
educator, and former politician from Georgia. Amerson is a Republican member of Georgia House of Representatives from 2001 to 2013.

Early life 
On January 30, 1935, Amerson was born in Washington County, Georgia.

Education 
In 1956, Amerson earned a Bachelor of Science degree from North Georgia College. In 1964, Amerson earned a Bachelor of Science degree from United States Naval Post Graduate School. In 1972, Amerson earned an MBA in Quantitative Methods from University of Hawaii. In 1993, Amerson earned a PhD in Economics/Statistics from American University in London.

Career 
In 1956, Amerson served in the United States Army and retired as a Lieutenant Colonel in 1978.

In 1978, Amerson was a Lieutenant/Analysis in the United States Department of Energy, until 1979.

In 1982, Amerson became an Associate Professor at North Georgia College and State University until 1998.

Amerson was a staff in Joint Chiefs of Staff's Joint Strategic Targeting Planning organization. Amerson was a Chief of the Strategic Analysis Section.

Personal life 
Amerson's wife is Anne Amerson. They have three children. Amerson and his family live in Dahlonega, Georgia.

See also 
 146th Georgia General Assembly

References

1935 births
Living people
Republican Party members of the Georgia House of Representatives
People from Dahlonega, Georgia
People from Washington County, Georgia